Serhiy Kozlov (born 16 December 1957 in Sverdlovsk Oblast) is a retired Soviet and Ukrainian football player and a current Ukrainian football coach.

References
 Profile at FFU Official Site (Ukr)
  Profile at FC Tytan Site

1957 births
Living people
Soviet footballers
Ukrainian footballers
Ukrainian football managers
FC Kryvbas Kryvyi Rih players
FC Tytan Armyansk players
FC Tytan Armyansk managers
FC Hirnyk Kryvyi Rih managers

Association football midfielders